Moody Blue is the second studio album by Canadian country music singer Beverley Mahood. Released in 2004 on Spin Records, it features the singles "My Wheels Got Wings" and "I Like That Shirt".

Track listing
"Free" (Noaise Sheridan, Allison Mellon) - 4:36
"The First Day You Wake Up Alone" (Sheridan, David Lee) - 4:22
"Making It Up as You Go" (Stan Meissner, Steve McEwan) - 4:45
"My Wheels Got Wings" (Vince Degiorgio, Steve Smith, Anthony Anderson, Joleen Belle) - 3:31
"I Like That Shirt" (Bryan Potvin, Beverley Mahood, Rob Wells) - 3:58
"You Can Never Tell" (Mahood, Sean Hogan) - 3:22
"Ghost of 66" (Gary O'Connor) - 3:48
"End of a Long Goodbye" (Potvin, Mahood, Wells) - 4:22
"Take Me Home" (Mahood, Steve Fox) - 3:45
"Hurt City" (Mahood, Hogan) - 4:27
"That Changes Everything" (Giselle Brohman, Jamie Warren) - 4:05
"Relentless Flame" (Mahood, Hogan) - 4:06

2004 albums
Beverley Mahood albums